Thought-Forms: A Record of Clairvoyant Investigation is a theosophical book compiled by the members of the Theosophical Society A. Besant and C. W. Leadbeater. It was originally published in 1905 in London.From the standpoint of Theosophy, it tells opinions regarding the visualization of thoughts, experiences, emotions and music. Drawings of the "thought-forms" were performed by John Varley Jr. (grandson of the painter John Varley), Prince, and McFarlane.

From history of compilation 
This book has become the result of the joint work of the authors, which began in 1895, when they had started an investigation of "the subtle matter of the universe." They were interested in the work of the human mind as, according to their claim, this work "extrudes into the external world" the thought-forms.

In September 1896, Besant reported in Lucifer that "two clairvoyant Theosophists" (whose personalities were not disclosed in the journal, although some members of the Society knew about them) had started "observing the substance of thought." Her article named Thought-Forms was accompanied by four pages of pictures of diverse thought-forms which the investigators "had observed and described to an artist." The colour sketches of the unknown performance were depicting: on the first plate—thought-forms of "devotion," "sacrifice," and "devotional," on the second one—three types of "anger," on the third one—three types of "love" ("undirected," "directed," and "grasping"), and on the fourth one—thought-forms of "jealousy," "intellect," and "ambition." Besant gave the article scientific coloring, not forgetting to mention Röntgen, Baraduc, Reichenbach, "vibrations and the ether."

This "small but influential book", which contains color pictures of thought-forms that the authors said are created "in subtle spirit-matter," was published in 1905. The book affirms that "the quality" of thoughts influences the life experience of their creator, and that they "can affect" other people.

Basic concepts

Meaning of color 

The authors write that they, like many theosophists, are convinced that "thoughts are things," and the task of their book is to help the reader understand this. The frontispiece of the book contains a table "The meanings of colours" of thought-forms and human aura associated with feelings and emotions, beginning with "High Spirituality" (light blue—in the upper left corner) and ending by "Malice" (black—in the lower right corner), 25 colors in all. The authors argue that human aura is "the outer part of the cloud-like substance of his higher bodies, interpenetrating each other, and extending beyond the confines of his physical body." The mental and desire bodies (two human higher bodies) are "those chiefly concerned with the appearance of what are called thought-forms."

Three principles and three classes 
The book states that "the production of all thought-forms" is based on three major principles:
 Quality of thought determines colour.
 Nature of thought determines form.
 Definiteness of thought determines clearness of outline.

The authors define the following three classes of thought-forms:
 That which takes the image of the thinker. When a man thinks of himself as in some distant place, or wishes earnestly to be in that place, he makes a thought-form in his own image which appears there.
 That which takes the image of some material object. [The painter who forms a conception of his future picture builds it up out of the matter of his mental body, and then projects it into space in front of him, keeps it before his mind's eye, and copies it. The novelist in the same way builds images of his character in mental matter, and by the exercise of his will moves these puppets from one position or grouping to another, so that the plot of his story is literally acted out before him.]
 That which takes a form entirely its own, expressing its inherent qualities in the matter which it draws round it. [Those of which we here give specimens are almost wholly of that class.]

Examples of thought-forms 

"To paint in earth's dull colours the forms clothed in the living light of other worlds, — Besant writes in the foreword, — is a hard and thankless task." The authors claim that the images in the book "are not imaginary forms, prepared as some dreamer thinks that they ought to appear." Rather, "they
are representations of forms actually observed as thrown off by ordinary men and women." And the authors sincerely hope that they will force the reader "realise the nature and power of his thoughts, acting as a stimulus to the noble, a curb on the base."

Created by emotions 

In Fig. 13 shows the thought-form created by "a strong craving for personal possession." Its color has dull unpleasing hue "deadened with the heavy tint indicative of selfishness." The curving hooks are its especially characteristic. Creator this thought-form had never "conception of the self-sacrificing love which pours itself out in joyous service," no thinking of return.

The authors write that a form in Fig. 19 at the top is a specific thought-form which had accompanied a question demonstrating deep thought and penetration. The first variant of the answer did not fully satisfy the questioner, and his desire to achieve a full and comprehensive answer was expressed in the fact that his "thought-form deepened in colour and changed into the second of the two shapes (in Fig. 19 below), resembling a corkscrew even more closely than before."

Fig. 22 and 23 are thought-forms of a "murderous rage" (on the right) and a "sustained anger" (on the left). The first form was taken "from the aura of a rough and partially intoxicated man in the East End of London," when he was knocking down a woman; a flare flashed in her direction, triggering an explosion of horror—she recognized that one would be struck. In the same illustration drawn a "stiletto-like dart" directed to the lower left corner: it is a thought "of steady anger, intense and desiring vengeance, of the quality of murder, sustained through years, and directed against a person who had inflicted a deep injury on the one who sent it forth."

The authors state that when a person is suddenly frightened, then has a place the effect shown in Fig. 27. It is emphasized that "all the crescents" on the right, which apparently have been emitted earlier than others, do not show anything other than "the livid grey of fear; but a moment later the man is already partially recovering from the shock, and beginning to feel angry that he allowed himself to be startled." The later crescents have changed to scarlet, and it evidences the "mingling of anger and fear," while the last crescent is quite scarlet, and it shows that "already the fright is entirely overcome, and only the annoyance remains."

Created by experiences 
Beginning from Fig. 30, "the book changes course in an interesting way," moving from the illustrations of individual thoughts and emotions to the narrative of events. Besant and Leadbeater write that occasioned by a "terrible accident" at sea, three thought-forms depicted in Fig. 30 "were seen simultaneously, arranged exactly as represented, though in the midst of indescribable confusion." The authors continue:
"They are instructive as showing how differently people are affected by sudden and serious danger. One form [on the right] shows nothing but an eruption of the livid grey of fear, rising out of a basis of utter selfishness: and unfortunately there were many such as this. The shattered appearance of the thought-form shows the violence and completeness of the explosion, which in turn indicates that the whole soul of that person was possessed with blind, frantic terror, and that the overpowering sense of personal danger excluded for the time every higher feeling."

The authors explain that the thought-form in Fig. 30 on the left shows an attempt to find "solace in prayer," and in this way overcome fear. This can be seen under a grayish-blue color, "which lifts itself hesitatingly upwards." Yet it is seen that judging by "the lower part of the thought-form, with its irregular outline and its falling fragments, that there is in reality almost as much fright here" as in the case on the right. Thus, one person has a chance to restore "self-control," while the other remains "an abject slave to overwhelming emotion." The thought-form at upper has been created by a member of the ship crew responsible for the lives of passengers, and it demonstrates a "very striking contrast" of the weakness manifesting in two forms from below. Herein shown "a powerful, clear-cut and definite thought, obviously full" of energy and determination. Orange color speaks of his confidence in ability to manage with the difficulty. The "brilliant yellow" means that his intellect is already at work upon the problem. 

Fig. 31 is another declarative piece, depicting "the thought-form of an actor while waiting to go upon the stage." The authors expound that the orange band indicates self-confidence,
"yet in spite of this there is a good deal of unavoidable uncertainty as to how this new play may strike the fickle public, and on the whole the doubt and fear overbalance the certainty and pride, for there is more of the pale grey than of the orange, and the whole thought-form vibrates like a flag flapping in a gale of wind." 

In the thought-form on the left in Fig. 34, as the authors explain, there is nothing but "the highest and most beautiful" feelings. At the base of the thought-form, you can see "a full expression of deep sympathy," the light green color shows the understanding of the suffering of the deceased's relatives and condolence with them, and the strip "of deeper green shows the attitude of the thinker towards the dead man himself." The dense rose-color shows love to both the deceased and the surrounding, while the upper part, consisting of a cone and stars above it, indicates a feeling in connection with thoughts of death: the blue express "its devotional aspect," while as "the violet shows the thought of, and the power to respond to, a noble ideal" and the ability to match, the stars reflect "the spiritual aspirations." In the same figure, the thought-form on the right reflects nothing but only "profound depression, fear and selfishness." His only definite feelings are despair and the sense of his personal loss, and these show themselves in proper strips of brown-grey and leaden grey color, while the "very curious downward protrusion" demonstrates the strong selfish desire to raise the dead man into his earth life.

Created by meditation 

The description of the event depicted in the book on Fig. 38, as noted a historian Breen, "anticipates the 1960s" as well with its conjunction of meditation and idealism: this thought-form was "generated by one who was trying, while sitting in meditation, to fill his mind with an aspiration to enfold all mankind in order to draw them upward towards the high ideal which shone so clearly before his eyes." The ability of the authors to see the "vibrations of ideas, emotions,  and sounds" demonstrates, in his opinion, "a sort of spiritual synesthesia" which transform the religious act into a neurological phenomenon.

The authors write that the thought-form shown in Fig. 41 was accompanied by "the devotional aspiration" to that Logos may thus be manifested through the man in meditation. It is this religious feeling gives a "pale blue" shade to the five-pointed star. This form has been used "for many ages as a symbol of God manifest in man."

Created by music 

Plate M showing the form created by music of Mendelssohn "depicts yellow, red, blue and green lines rising out of a church." This, as the authors explain, "signifies the movement of one of the parts of the melody, the four moving approximately together denoting the treble, alto, tenor and bass respectively." Moreover, "the scalloped edging surrounding the whole is the result of various flourishes and arpeggios, and the floating crescents in the centre represent isolated or staccato chords."

On Plate G depicts a musical form to the piece by Gounod. Describing a musical form "created" by Wagner (on Plate W), the authors note in it the likeness to the "successively retreating" ramparts of a mountain, "and it is heightened by the billowy masses of cloud which roll between the crags and give the effect of perspective."

Thought-Forms and modern art 

According to professor Ellwood, the book by Besant and Leadbeater had a large influence on modern art. "It suggested, to a world moving rapidly beyond the literalism of Victorian art, the expression in painting of surreal forms and forces underlying, but different from, the visible world." Thought-Forms demonstrated how the symbolism of "astral colors and forms" can express the specificity of "certain soul's and mental states." It had a great influence on Kandinsky as one of the essential factors that led to the "genius opening of new perspectives for painting."

According to reminiscences by Sabaneyev, besides The Secret Doctrine Scriabin interested a magazine Vestnik Theosofii, which published [from 1908] the translations of Besant and Leadbeater's works. Apparently, being impressed by theirs theosophical works, he once said that "strong, powerful thought creates a thought-form so intense that it, in addition to the will, flows into the consciousness of other people." The perform of the part of light in Prometheus he imagined in the form of a radiance of some "luminous matter," which was supposed to fill the hall.

A historian Breen wrote that Besant and Leadbeater were well aware how annoying stuff may be their book for a "society that remained deeply conservative". In early January 1901, when this book was published, "Queen Victoria still ruled England. 'Modernism' as a movement or even a concept did not exist. When we consider this world of 1901, – further wrote Breen, – it becomes difficult not to believe that Besant, Leadbeater and their milieu deserve a more prominent place in the annals of both abstract art and the history of modernism". As the art critic Kramer has pointed, "what is particularly striking about the outlook of the artists primarily responsible for creating abstraction is their espousal of occult doctrine." Yeats, Eliot, Malevich, Kandinsky, and Mondrian were charmed by Theosophy. In the first decades of the twentieth century, it was a widespread "component of Western cultural life".

Thus, Besant and Ledbetter had played, summed up Breen, "a small but intriguing role in shaping the globalized culture... which weaves together East and West, mysticism and rationalism, sound and sight."

Criticism 

An academic science names the activities of such "investigators," as the authors of this book, "pseudoscience", because it is based on a concept of the extrasensory perception. The belief in existence of thought-forms "remains influential today" for the Theosophists, followers of New Thought, New Age and in neopagan movements, including Wicca.

New editions and translations 
After its first publication in 1905 the book was reprinted several times (8th – in 1971). This work has been translated into several European languages: French, German, Italian, Portuguese, Russian, Spanish.

See also 
 Clairvoyance
 How Theosophy Came to Me
 Man: Whence, How and Whither
 Occult Chemistry
 Theosophy and visual arts
 Tulpa

Notes

References

Sources 
 
 
 
 
 
 
 
 
 
 
 
 
 
 
 
 
 
 
 
 
 
 
 
 
 
 
 
 
 
 
 
 
 
 
 
  
 
 

in Russian

External links 

 Thought-Forms.
 Thought-Forms.

1905 non-fiction books
Theosophical texts
Parapsychology
Abstract art
Synesthesia